NA-169 Rahim Yar Khan-I is a constituency for the National Assembly of Pakistan.

Election 2002 

General elections were held on 10 Oct 2002. Makhdoom Syed Ahmad Alam Anwar an Independent candidate won by 74,933 votes.

Election 2008 

General elections were held on 18 Feb 2008. Syed Hamid Saeed Kazmi of PPP won by 65,395 votes.

Election 2013 

General elections were held on 11 May 2013. Khwaja Ghulam Rasool Koreja of 
PPP won by 80,499 votes and became the  member of National Assembly.

Election 2018

See also
NA-168 Bahawalpur-V
NA-170 Rahim Yar Khan-II

References

External links 
Election result's official website

NA-192